United States v. Google LLC is an ongoing federal antitrust case brought by the United States Department of Justice (DOJ) against Google LLC on October 20, 2020. The suit alleges that Google has violated the Sherman Antitrust Act of 1890 through anti-competitive behavior in the search engine and search advertising markets.

The lawsuit has been described as the most important federal antitrust lawsuit since United States v. Microsoft Corp. was launched in 1998. The case is expected to go to trial in September 2023.

Background 
The rapid growth of the U.S. tech industry in the 1990s led to concerns about potential for anti-competitive behavior in the sector. This ultimately led to the federal government launching an antitrust suit against Microsoft, alleging that the company unfairly hindered competition.

In the 2010s, concerns about potential anti-competitive behavior by "Big Tech" (Google, Apple, Amazon, Facebook) companies were became subject to lawmaker scrutiny. On October 6, 2020, the Democratic majority staff on the House Judiciary Subcommittee on Antitrust, Commercial and Administrative Law released a nearly 450-page report following a 16-month long investigation concluding that the companies wield "monopoly power".

Prior antitrust scrutiny of Google 
In 2008, scrutiny from the Department of Justice (DOJ) and the Canadian Competition Bureau scrutiny of an advertising deal between Google and Yahoo! led the companies to abandon their agreement. According to the DOJ, the "agreement between these two companies accounting for 90 percent or more of each relevant market" would have likely harmed "competition in the markets for Internet search advertising and Internet search syndication".

In 2011, members of the U.S. Federal Trade Commission (FTC) voted to demand information from Google as part of an antitrust inquiry into the company's search engine practices. Following a nineteen-month investigation, FTC staff attorneys recommended that the agency bring forth an antitrust lawsuit against Google. However, the members of the commissioners ultimately declined this recommendation, and voted on January 3, 2013, to close the investigation.

During the 2010s, the European Commission engaged in antitrust scrutiny of Google, leading to the company being found guilty of competition law breaches in three separate cases. The United States v. Google lawsuit has been specifically compared to the European Commission's lawsuit against Google's Android practices.

Allegations 
In United States v. Google LLC, the federal government alleges that Google has unfairly hindered competition in the search market through anti-competitive deals with Apple as well as mobile carriers. The government alleges that, as a result of these practices, Google has accumulated control of around 88% of the domestic search engine market.

In doing so, the government alleges, Google has additionally monopolized the search advertising market at the expense of competing services. Per the government's estimation, Google has been able to accumulate control of over 70% of the search advertising market. As a result of lack of competition, Google has been able to over-charge advertisers versus what they would pay in a competitive environment.

Proceedings 

The Department of Justice (DOJ) formally brought the case on October 20, 2020, in conjunction with state attorneys general representing the following states: Arkansas, Florida, Georgia, Indiana, Kentucky, Louisiana, Mississippi, Missouri, Montana, South Carolina, and Texas. Makan Delrahim, then serving as Assistant Attorney General for the DOJ Antitrust Division, had recused himself during the probe earlier in the year due to his past professional work for Google. It was reported in December 2020 that the trial would likely begin on September 12, 2023.

Following the confirmation of Jonathan Kanter as Assistant Attorney General for the DOJ Antitrust Division, Google questioned Kanter's impartiality in the case given his past work for rival companies. Constitutional scholar Laurence Tribe criticized Google's claims, arguing they have "little legal basis and strain common sense". In May 2022, it was reported that Kanter would be barred from working on the case as the DOJ considers mandating his recusal.

Owing to the accusation that Google engaged in anti-competitive conduct through exclusivity dealings with Apple, it was reported in February 2022 that the government is looking to depose "Apple's most senior executives".

On December 12, 2022, Google asked the court to toss out the case, arguing that it fairly achieved its dominant market share and that the DOJ's argument "relies on dubious antitrust arguments."

Analysis 
The case has attracted public interest amid both domestic and international scrutiny of the four Big Tech companies. United States v. Google LLC has been compared to the United States v. Microsoft Corp. (2002), a noted antitrust case against Microsoft.

According to John Newman of the University of Miami School of Law, "U.S. v. Google might be the first big case against Big Tech, but it likely won’t be the last." Two months after United States v. Google was filed, the FTC would bring on an antitrust case against Facebook.

Public opinion 
Polling by advocacy group Demand Progress in October 2020 found that respondents across party lines support the suit by a 48% to 36% margin, with 52% of Republicans and 49% of Democrats found to be in support. A survey of tech workers at various firms conducted by workplace app Blind in October 2020 found that 57% of tech employees polled believe the suit has merit, though only 13% of Google workers said the same.

Response from officials 
Senator Elizabeth Warren (D-MA) praised the DOJ for bringing forth a "legitimate, long-time-coming suit against Google for engaging in anti-competitive, manipulative, and often illegal conduct". Senator Ted Cruz (R-TX) also praised the lawsuit, arguing that "Google abuses its power not just in the search market by using its monopoly power to make billions, but it also uses it to try to censor the American People".

Eric Schmidt, formerly CEO of both Google and parent company Alphabet Inc., criticized the lawsuit, stating that "There’s a difference between dominance and excellence".

Related cases 
In December 2020, a coalition of 38 states brought on a similar lawsuit against Google. Co-led by Colorado Attorney General Phil Weiser, the State of Colorado et al. v. Google LLC case reportedly "goes beyond the DOJ’s" in its scope of accusations, according to CNBC.

In July 2021, a coalition of attorneys general from 36 states and the District of Columbia launched an antitrust lawsuit alleging that Google has hindered competition in the app market through its Google Play store policies. In March 2022, it was reported that the DOJ was in the process of investigating if Google has engaged in anti-competitive conduct through bundling its Google Maps service with company software.

In January 2023, the DOJ filed a second antitrust suit against Google, centering on alleged anti-competitive conduct in the advertising technology (adtech) market. A Google spokesperson responded in a blog post saying that "Today's lawsuit from the Department of Justice attempts to pick winners and losers in the highly competitive advertising technology sector. It largely duplicates an unfounded lawsuit by the Texas Attorney General, much of which was recently dismissed by a federal court. DOJ is doubling down on a flawed argument that would slow innovation, raise advertising fees and make it harder for thousands of small businesses and publishers to grow. We've already responded in detail to many similar claims made in the complaint by the Texas Attorney General".

See also 

 Antitrust cases against Google
 Antitrust cases against Google by the European Union
 Federal Trade Commission v. Meta Platforms, Inc., also filed in 2020

References 

United States antitrust case law
Google litigation
2020 in United States case law
United States District Court for the District of Columbia cases